List of the members of the Faroese Løgting in the period 1980–1984. The parliament had 32 members this period.

Elected members of the Løgting

References 
«Løgtingið 150 – Hátíðarrit», Vol. 2 (2002). (PDF)

 1980
1980 in the Faroe Islands
1981 in the Faroe Islands
1982 in the Faroe Islands
1983 in the Faroe Islands
1984 in the Faroe Islands
1980–1984